The Philippine Senate Committee on Electoral Reforms and People's Participation is a standing committee of the Senate of the Philippines.

Jurisdiction 
According to the Rules of the Senate, the committee handles all matters relating to:

 Election laws and the implementation of the constitutional provisions on initiative and referendum on legislative acts
 Recall of elective officials
 Role and rights of people's organizations
 Sectoral or party-list representation
 The Commission on Elections

Members, 18th Congress 
Based on the Rules of the Senate, the Senate Committee on Electoral Reforms and People's Participation has 11 members.

The President Pro Tempore, the Majority Floor Leader, and the Minority Floor Leader are ex officio members.

Here are the members of the committee in the 18th Congress as of September 24, 2020:

Committee secretary: Atty. Dana Paula B. Mendiola-Alberto

See also 

 List of Philippine Senate committees

References 

Electoral
Elections in the Philippines